The DeJohnette Complex is the debut album by Jack DeJohnette featuring Bennie Maupin, Stanley Cowell, Miroslav Vitous, Eddie Gómez, and Roy Haynes recorded in 1968 and released on the Milestone label in 1969.

Reception
The Allmusic review by Scott Yanow states, "The music ranges from advanced swinging to brief free improvisations and some avant-funk... Intriguing and generally successful music". A JazzTimes reviewer selected it in 2012 as one of DeJohnette's key albums.

Track listing
All compositions by Jack DeJohnette except as indicated
 "Equipoise" (Stanley Cowell) - 3:58
 "The Major General" - 6:34
 "Miles' Mode" (John Coltrane) - 6:36
 "Requiem Number 1" - 2:21
 "Mirror Image" (Miroslav Vitous) - 5:08
 "Papa, Daddy and Me" - 7:53
 "Brown, Warm and Wintry" - 5:02
 "Requiem Number 2" - 1:41
Recorded at Dandon Productions, New York on December 26 and 27, 1968

Personnel
Jack DeJohnette: drums, melodica
Bennie Maupin: tenor saxophone, wood flute, flute 1, 2, 3, 4, 6
Stanley Cowell: electric piano, piano 
Miroslav Vitous; bass on tracks 1, 2, 4
Eddie Gómez: bass 3, 4, 5, 6
Roy Haynes: drums, percussion on tracks 1, 4

References

Jack DeJohnette albums
1969 debut albums
Milestone Records albums
Albums produced by Orrin Keepnews